Martinsen is a surname. Notable people with the surname include:

 Alf Martinsen, kwnon as "Kaka" (1911–1988), Norwegian football (soccer) player
 Andreas Martinsen (born 1990), Norwegian ice hockey player
 Andreas Martinsen (athlete) (born 1990), Danish athlete specialising in the sprint hurdles
 Astrid Murberg Martinsen (1932–1991), Norwegian politician 
 Bente Martinsen, also known as Bente Skari (born 1972), Norwegian former cross-country skier
 Gustav Martinsen (1843–1920), Norwegian industrial leader and politician
 Haavard Martinsen (1879–1967), Norwegian chemist and industrial leader
 Ivar Martinsen (1920–2018), Norwegian speed skater
 Kari Martinsen (born 1943), Norwegian nurse and academic
 Karl Martinsen, sometimes spelled Karl Marthinsen (1896–1945), Norwegian commander of Statspolitiet 
 Knud Børge Martinsen (1905–1949), Danish officer
 Odd Martinsen (born 1942), retired Norwegian cross-country skier 
 Ole Einar Martinsen (born 1967), retired Norwegian football defender
 Petter Martinsen (1887–1972), Norwegian gymnast
 Ragnvald Martinsen (1906–1987), Norwegian cyclist
 Rasmus Martinsen (born 1996), Norwegian footballer
 Sven Martinsen (1900–1968), Norwegian sport wrestler
 Thor Martinsen, known as "Mr Frisk" (born 1945) is a Norwegian ice hockey player
 Vidar Martinsen (born 1982), Norwegian footballer
 Ylva Martinsen, also known as Ylva Lindberg (born 1976), Swedish retired ice hockey player

Danish-language surnames
Norwegian-language surnames
Patronymic surnames
Surnames from given names